Zlatni Prsti (trans. The Golden Fingers) is the eponymous debut studio album by Yugoslav rock band Zlatni Prsti. It was issued in 1976 by PGP-RTB.

Track listing

Personnel
 Momčilo Radenković – guitar, vocals
 Dragan Batalo – keyboards
 Slobodan Radenković – bass
 Dragan Trajković – drums, percussion

Additional personnel
Dragan Vukićević - sound engineer
Tahir Durkalić - sound engineer
Aca Portnoj - cover, design

Sources
 
 Zlatni Prsti at Rate Your Music

External links
Zlatni Prsti at Discogs

Zlatni Prsti albums
1976 debut albums
PGP-RTB albums